The Artemision Bronze (often called the God from the Sea) is an ancient Greek sculpture that was recovered from the sea off Cape Artemision, in northern Euboea, Greece. According to most scholars, the bronze represents Zeus, the thunder-god and king of gods, though it has also been suggested it might represent Poseidon. The statue is slightly over lifesize at 209 cm, and would have held either a thunderbolt, if Zeus, or a trident if Poseidon.  The empty eye-sockets were originally inset, probably with bone, as well as the eyebrows (with silver), the lips, and the nipples (with copper). The sculptor is unknown. The statue is a highlight of the collections in the National Archaeological Museum of Athens.

Subject

The debate over whether the statue represents Poseidon or Zeus hinges on the lost attribute held in the figure's right hand. As Caroline Houser writes, "Sometimes the Artemision protector is called 'Poseidon'. Those who would do so have been known to argue that the image must be that of the great sea god since the statue was found in the Mediterranean. But like other statues of totally different subjects, this one went into the sea simply because it was on board a ship that sank. Others cite the example of the Poseidonia coins, overlooking the much weightier evidence presented by the numerous surviving statuettes of Zeus launching his thunderbolt in a pose matching that of the Artemision figure."

A major additional problem with that hypothesis is that a trident would obscure the face, especially from the profile view, which most scholars (even those who have supported an identification as Poseidon) have held to be the most, or even the only, important view. Iconographic parallels with coins and vase painting from the same time period show that this obscuring pose is extremely unlikely. However, the trident may have been unusually short, avoiding the problem. On the other hand, the statue is essentially a larger version of an extensive series of smaller solid bronze figurines extending back into the late 7th century, all of which strike the same pose and represent Zeus. On the basis of this and other iconographic parallels with vase-painting, most scholars presently think it is a Zeus. However, opinion remains divided.

The iconography of Ancient Greek pottery portrays Poseidon wielding the trident, when in combat, in more of a stabbing motion (similar to a fencing stance or an 'advance-lunge'); Zeus is depicted fighting with his arm raised, holding the lightning bolt overhead, in the same position as the Artemision Bronze (see 'Poseidon and the Giant Polybotes', an Attic red-figure stamnos attributed to the Trolios Painter, as well as 'Zeus hurling his lightning at Typhon'  which is a black-figured Chalcidian hydria).

The god is caught at the moment of pause in the full potentiality of his coming movement, described by Carol Mattusch: "the figure has the potential for violence, is concentrating, poised to throw, but the action is just beginning, and we are left to contemplate the coming demonstration of strength." A comparison can be made with the Charioteer of Delphi, a roughly contemporaneous bronze.

Sculptor
Discussions concerning its provenance have found champions for most of the Greek mainland centers technically capable of such a large-scale sculpture: Attica— where Christos Karouzos associates it with Kalamis (about 470–440 BCE) — Boeotia, Aegina, Sicyon or Argos. The sculpture has also been associated with Onatas or Myron and also Kritios and Nesiotes but there is no way of knowing for certain who created the work.

History

The sculpture was first discovered in 1926 and further excavated in 1928, at the site of a shipwreck that occurred no earlier than the middle of the second century BC. Unfortunately, not much is known about the wreck, because exploration was abandoned when a diver died, in 1928, and was never resumed. Many such shipwrecks are of Roman date and were of vessels looting Greek art to Italy, but it is unclear whether the Artemision wreck is one of these. The Jockey of Artemision – a bronze statue of a racehorse and its jockey – was recovered from the same shipwreck, and Seán Hemingway has suggested that the jockey and horse may have been looted from Corinth in 146 BC by the Roman general Mummius in the Achaean War and was on its way to Pergamon when lost.

The sculpture's head, now an icon of Hellenic culture, formed the subject of a Greek 500 drachma postage stamp (in use 1954–1977) and a 1000 drachma banknote (first issue 1970, replaced in 1987).

References and sources

References

Sources

 F. Noack in Die Antike 5 (1929), pp
 Mylonas in American Journal of Archaeology 48 (1944) pp 143ff. A case for the subject as Zeus.
 Carol C. Mattusch: Greek Bronze Statuary: From the Beginnings Through the Fifth Century B.C. (Ithaca:Cornell University Press 1988, pp. 150–153.
Dafas, K. A., 2019. Greek Large-Scale Bronze Statuary: The Late Archaic and Classical Periods, Institute of Classical Studies, School of Advanced Study, University of London, Bulletin of the Institute of Classical Studies, Monograph, BICS Supplement 138 (London), pp. 36–50, pls 31–40.

External links

National Archaeological Museum of Athens: highlights
 Illustration of the complete sculpture

1926 archaeological discoveries
5th-century BC Greek sculptures
Ancient Euboea
Ancient Greek bronze statues of the classical period
Bronze sculptures in Greece
Archaeological discoveries in Greece
Arts in Central Greece
National Archaeological Museum, Athens
Nude sculptures
Sculptures in Athens
Sculptures of Zeus
Sculptures of Poseidon
Sculptures of men in Greece
Statues in Greece